Nocturnal Omissions was the final, posthumous release by Athens, Georgia, United States, band Dreams So Real.  Self-released in 1992, it was a collection of unreleased and rare tracks.

Track listing
 "(Maybe I'll Go) Today"
 "Heaven"
 "Window"
 "History"
 "Up To Fate"
 "Golden"
 "Everywhere Girl"
 "Whirl"
 "And So We Love"
 "Open Your Eyes"
 "Entwined"
 "A Shipwrecked Sailor"
 "Appalachee Shoals"
 "Please Don't Cry"
 "In The Garden"
 "Egypt"
 "There's A Fire"
 "Red Lights (Merry Christmas)"
 "Just For Christmas Day"

Dreams So Real albums
1992 albums